Rajdhani College, is a college owned by the Government of Odisha located in the capital city of Bhubaneswar, Odisha. The College started in 1973 as one of 3 Government colleges in the City of Bhubaneswar in addition to the Buxi Jagabandhu Bidyadhar College and College of Basic Science and Humanities, Bhubaneswar for general science and arts studies. In 1975 the college was shifted to a temporary government building located in Unit-I and functioned there for a period of fourteen years as an independent institution. It was shifted to its new building at Baramunda in 1989. The college is affiliated with the Council of Higher Secondary Education, Odisha in +2 streams and to the Utkal University at the Degree stage. The college is very well located close to NH 5 and is accessible from various locations of Bhubaneswar due to proximity of largest bus-stand.

History 

Rajdhani College, a college in Bhubaneswar, Odisha, started functioning as the morning shift of B.J.B College, Bhubaneswar in 1973 with provision for teaching Intermediate and Degree classes in the Arts. In 1975 the college was shifted to a temporary government building located in Unit-I and functioned there for a period of fourteen years as an independent institution. It was shifted to its new building at Baramunda in 1989. The college is affiliated with the Council of Higher Secondary Education, Odisha in +2 streams and to the Utkal University at the Degree stage. The admission into various program are conducted as per the merit list prepared by under the e-admission process as per the rules of Government of Odisha.

Departments 

Rajdhani College is considered as one of 3 Government colleges in the City of Bhubaneswar in addition to the B.J.B College and College of Basic Science and Humanities, Bhubaneswar for general arts, commerce, and science studies. The College at present has the following departments :

Programs 

The college is affiliated with the Council of Higher Secondary Education, Odisha in +2 streams and to the Utkal University at the Degree stage. The College has various 10+2 and 10+3 classes in arts, science, and commerce disciplines as follows:

Gallery

Principals of the College 

Following is a list of Principals who have led the College after 1975.

Notable alumni
 Saraju Mohanty, Professor at the University of North Texas, Denton, United States.

References

Department of Higher Education, Odisha
Universities and colleges in Bhubaneswar
Utkal University
Educational institutions established in 1973
1973 establishments in Orissa